Alexis Bonami (27 November 1796 – 11 December 1890) was a voyageur and boat brigade leader based at the Red River settlement. He achieved historical significance for his leadership of the Portage La Loche brigade. During the War of 1812 he served in a regiment commanded by Lieutenant-Colonel James Cuthbert.

See also 
 Methye Portage

References 
 

Canadian fur traders
Canadian people of the War of 1812
Pre-Confederation Quebec people
People from Montérégie
1796 births
1890 deaths